For the 1939–40 season, Carlisle United F.C. competed in the Third Division North before the declaration of the Second World War suspended the Football League after two matches.

Results & fixtures

Division Three North

Selected results

References

 11v11

External links

Carlisle United F.C. seasons